The supercritical water reactor (SCWR) is a concept Generation IV reactor, designed as a light water reactor (LWR) that operates at supercritical pressure (i.e. greater than 22.1 MPa). The term critical in this context refers to the critical point of water, and must not be confused with the concept of criticality of the nuclear reactor.

The water heated in the reactor core becomes a supercritical fluid above the critical temperature of 374 °C, transitioning from a fluid more resembling liquid water to a fluid more resembling saturated steam (which can be used in a steam turbine), without going through the distinct phase transition of boiling.

In contrast, the well-established pressurized water reactors (PWR) have a primary cooling loop of liquid water at a subcritical pressure, transporting heat from the reactor core to a secondary cooling loop, where the steam for driving the turbines is produced in a boiler (called the steam generator).
Boiling water reactors (BWR) operate at even lower pressures, with the boiling process to generate the steam happening in the reactor core.

The supercritical steam generator is a proven technology.
The development of SCWR systems is considered a promising advancement for nuclear power plants because of its high thermal efficiency (~45 % vs. ~33 % for current LWRs) and simpler design. As of 2012 the concept was being investigated by 32 organizations in 13 countries.

History 

The super-heated steam cooled reactors operating at subcritical-pressure were experimented with in both Soviet Union and in the United States as early as the 1950s and 1960s such as Beloyarsk Nuclear Power Station, Pathfinder and Bonus of GE's Operation Sunrise program. These are not SCWRs. SCWRs were developed from the 1990s onwards.
Both a LWR-type SCWR with a reactor pressure vessel and a CANDU-type SCWR with pressure tubes are being developed.

A 2010 book includes conceptual design and analysis methods such as core design, plant system, plant dynamics and control, plant startup and stability, safety, fast reactor design etc.

A 2013 document saw the completion of a prototypical fueled loop test in 2015. A Fuel Qualification Test was completed in 2014.

A 2014 book saw reactor conceptual design of a thermal spectrum reactor (Super LWR) and a fast reactor (Super FR) and experimental results of thermal hydraulics, materials and material-coolant interactions.

Design

Moderator-coolant 

The SCWR operates at supercritical pressure. The reactor outlet coolant is  supercritical water. Light water is used as a neutron moderator and coolant. Above the critical point, steam and liquid become the same density and are indistinguishable, eliminating the need for pressurizers and steam generators (PWR), or jet/recirculation pumps, steam separators and dryers (BWR). Also by avoiding boiling, SCWR does not generate chaotic voids (bubbles) with less density and moderating effect. In a LWR this can affect heat transfer and water flow, and the feedback can make the reactor power harder to predict and control. Neutronic and thermal hydraulic coupled calculation is needed to predict the power distribution. SCWR's simplification should reduce construction costs and improve reliability and safety.
A LWR type SCWR adopts water rods with thermal insulation and a CANDU type SCWR keeps water moderator in a Calandria tank. A fast reactor core of the LWR type SCWR adopts tight fuel rod lattice as a high conversion LWR. The fast neutron spectrum SCWR has advantages of a higher power density, but needs plutonium and uranium mixed oxides fuel which will be available from reprocessing.

Control 

SCWRs would likely have control rods inserted through the top, as is done in PWRs.

Material 

The temperature inside an SCWR is higher than those in LWRs. Although supercritical fossil fuel plants have much experience in the materials, it does not include the combination of high temperature environment and intense neutron radiation. SCWRs need core materials (especially fuel cladding) to resist the environment. R&D focuses on:
 The chemistry of supercritical water under radiation (preventing stress corrosion cracking, and maintaining corrosion resistance under neutron radiation and high temperatures)
 Dimensional and microstructural stability (preventing embrittlement, retaining strength and creep resistance also under radiation and high temperatures)
 Materials that both resist the high temperature conditions and do not absorb too many neutrons, which affects fuel economy
In the once-through coolant cycles, such as SCWRs and supercritical fossil fired power plants, the entire reactor coolant is processed at low temperature after condensation. It is an advantage in managing water chemistry and stress corrosion cracking of structural materials. It is not possible in LWRs due to the recirculation of hot reactor coolant. Materials and water chemistry R&D should be done with the once-through characteristics in mind.

Advantages 

 Supercritical water has excellent heat transfer properties allowing a high-power density, a small core, and a small containment structure.
 The use of a supercritical Rankine cycle with its typically higher temperatures improves efficiency (would be ~45 % versus ~33 % of current PWR/BWRs).
 This higher efficiency would lead to better fuel economy and a lighter fuel load, lessening residual (decay) heat.
 SCWR is typically designed as a direct cycle, whereby steam or hot supercritical water from the core is used directly in a steam turbine. This makes the design simple. As a BWR is simpler than a PWR, a SCWR is a lot simpler and more compact than a less-efficient BWR having the same electrical output. There are no steam separators, steam dryers, internal recirculation pumps, or recirculation flow inside the pressure vessel. The design is a once-through, direct-cycle, the simplest type of cycle possible. The stored thermal and radiologic energy in the smaller core and its (primary) cooling circuit would also be less than that of either a BWR's or a PWR's.
 Water is liquid at room temperature, cheap, non-toxic and transparent, simplifying inspection and repair (compared to liquid metal cooled reactors).
 A fast SCWR could be a breeder reactor, like the proposed Clean and Environmentally Safe Advanced Reactor and could burn the long-lived actinide isotopes.
 A heavy-water SCWR could breed fuel from thorium (4x more abundant than uranium). Similar to a CANDU it could also use unenriched natural uranium if enough moderation is provided
 Process heat can be delivered at higher temperatures than other water-cooled reactors allow

Disadvantages 

 Lower water inventory (due to compact primary loop) means less heat capacity to buffer transients and accidents (e.g., loss of feedwater flow or large break loss-of-coolant accident) resulting in accident and transient temperatures that are too high for conventional metallic cladding.
However, it is not too high for stainless steel cladding. Safety analysis of LWR type SCWR showed that safety criteria are met with margins at accidents and abnormal transients including total loss of flow and loss of coolant accident. No double ended break occurs because of the once-through coolant cycle. Core is cooled by the induced flow at the loss of coolant accident.  The water inventory in the top dome of the reactor vessel serves as an in-vessel accumulator. The SCWR safety principle is not to maintain coolant inventory, but to maintain core coolant flow rate. It is easy to monitor than water level at accidents. There was an error in the water level signal in the Three Mile Island accident and the operators shut down the ECCS.
 Higher pressure combined with higher temperature and also a higher temperature rises across the core (compared to PWR/BWRs) result in increased mechanical and thermal stresses on vessel materials that are difficult to solve. 
However, a LWR type design, reactor pressure vessel inner wall is cooled by the inlet coolant as PWR. Outlet coolant nozzles are equipped with thermal sleeves. A pressure-tube design, where the core is divided up into smaller tubes for each fuel channel, has potentially fewer issues here, as smaller diameter tubing can be much thinner than massive single pressure vessels, and the tube can be insulated on the inside with inert ceramic insulation so it can operate at low (calandria water) temperature.

• The coolant greatly reduces its density at the end of the core, resulting in a need to place extra moderator there.

However, a LWR type SCWR design adopts water rods in the fuel assemblies as BWRs.  The coolant density in water rods is kept high with thin thermal insulation, not fully insulated. Most designs of CANDU type SCWR use an internal calandria where part of the feedwater flow is guided through top tubes through the core, that provide the added moderation (feedwater) in that region. This has the added advantage of being able to cool the entire vessel wall with feedwater, but results in a complex and materially demanding (high temperature, high temperature differences, high radiation) internal calandria and plena arrangement. A pressure-tube design has the characteristics as most of the moderator is in the calandria at low temperature and pressure, reducing the coolant density effect on moderation, and the actual pressure tube can be kept cool by the calandria water. 

• Extensive material development and research on supercritical water chemistry under radiation is needed. 

However, the entire SCWR coolant is cleaned after condensation. This is an advantage in managing water chemistry and Stress corrosion cracking of structural materials. It is not possible in LWRs where hot coolant circulates.

• Special start-up procedures needed to avoid instability before the water reaches supercritical conditions.

However, Instability is managed by power to coolant flow rate ratio as a BWR. The coolant density change is smaller in SCWRs than BWRs.

• A fast SCWR needs a relatively complex reactor core to have a negative void coefficient. 

However, single coolant flow pass core is feasible.

• As with all alternatives to currently widespread designs (mostly subcritical water cooled, water moderated thermal reactors of some kind) there will be fewer suppliers of technology and parts and less expertise at least initially than for decades old proven technology or its evolutionary improvements such as generation III+ reactors.

However, LWRs were developed in the 1950s based on the subcritical fossil fired power technologies. The success of LWRs is based on that experience. Supercritical fossil fired power plants were developed after 1950s. Components such as valves, piping, turbines, feedwater pumps and heaters for operation at turbine throttle pressure up to 30MPa and temperature up to 630C are present for commercial applications. SCWRs are natural evolution of LWRs. The competitiveness of LWRs in the electricity market is being challenged in the US due to Shale gas from historical summaries of U.S. Energy Information Administration’s (EIA’s) Levelized cost of electricity(LCOE) projections (2010-2020) in Cost of electricity by source. LWRs are the dominant design with the largest share of nuclear power generation and are the current offering for new construction in the world. Innovation dynamics show that innovation does not come from companies with the largest market share. Comparing SCWRs and LWRs is not relevant in terms of innovation dynamics. If Small modular reactor(SMR) is competitive, a SMR version of SCWRs will increase its advantage.

• The chemical shim might behave drastically different as the solution properties of supercritical water are vastly different from those of liquid water. Currently most pressurized water reactors employ boric acid to control reactivity early in burnup.

However, chemical shim cannot be used in SCWRs as well as BWRs, due to the positive coolant void coefficient. SCWRs use borated water as the secondary shut-down similar to BWRs.

•Depending on design online refuelling may be impossible. While CANDUs are capable of online refuelling, other water moderated reactors are not. 

However, the Capacity factor of LWRs is already high in USA, over 90%. Pressure vessel type SCWRs do not require online refuelling.

See also 

 Generation IV reactor
 Breeder reactor
 Reduced moderation water reactor, a concept that is in some ways similar and in others overlapping to the SCWR concept, and is under development apart from the Generation IV program.
 Generation III reactor
 Advanced Boiling Water Reactor (ABWR)
 Economic Simplified Boiling Water Reactor (ESBWR) (generation III+)

References 

 INL SCWR page
 INL presentation
 INL Progress Report for the FY-03 Generation-IV R&D Activities for the Development of the SCWR in the U.S.
 Generation IV International Forum SCWR website.
 INL SCWR workshop summary

External links 

 Idaho National Laboratory Supercritical-Water-Cooled Reactor (SCWR) Fact Sheet
 UW presentation: SCWR  Fuel Rod Design Requirements (PowerPoint presentation).
 ANL SCWR Stability Analysis (PowerPoint presentation).
 INL ADVANCED REACTOR, FUEL CYCLE,AND ENERGY PRODUCTS WORKSHOP FOR UNIVERSITIES (PDF).
 Natural circulation in water cooled nuclear power plants (IAEA-TECDOC-1474)

Nuclear power reactor types
Light water reactors
Fast-neutron reactors